Theophilus Tetteh Chaie (born April 4, 1972) is a Ghanaian politician and member of the Sixth Parliament of the Fourth Republic representing the  Ablekuma Central Constituency in the Greater Accra Region of Ghana.

Personal life 
Chaie is a Christian and a member of the Methodist Church. He is married with one child.

Early life and education 
Chaie was born on April 4, 1972. He hails from Osudoku, a town in the Greater Accra Region of Ghana. He graduated from the Chartered Institute of Marketing, UK, and obtained his Certificate in marketing in 1981.

Politics 
Chaie  was first elected into Parliament in the ticket of the National Democratic Congress (NDC) representing Ablekuma Central Constituency in January 2009. He polled 43,253 votes representing 51.01%.  In 2012, he contested for re-election into the  Ablekuma Central parliamentary seat on the ticket of the NDC sixth parliament of the fourth republic and won with 43,253 votes out of the 84,785 valid votes cast in his Constituency.

Career 
Chaie was the Headmaster of St. Charles Preparatory School in Accra and an educationist, before taking the appointment as a member of Parliament.

References 

Ghanaian MPs 2013–2017
1972 births
Living people
National Democratic Congress (Ghana) politicians